The Human Torch (Jonathan "Johnny" Storm) is a superhero appearing in American comic books published by Marvel Comics. The character is a founding member of the Fantastic Four. He is writer Stan Lee's and artist Jack Kirby's reinvention of a similar, previous character, the android Human Torch of the same name and powers who was created in 1939 by writer-artist Carl Burgos for Marvel Comics' predecessor company, Timely Comics.

Like the rest of the Fantastic Four, Johnny gained his powers on a spacecraft bombarded by cosmic rays. He can engulf his entire body in flames, fly, absorb fire harmlessly into his own body, and control any nearby fire by sheer force of will. "Flame on!", which the Torch customarily shouts when activating his full-body flame effect, has become his catchphrase. The youngest of the group, he is brash and impetuous in comparison to his reticent, overprotective and compassionate older sister, Susan Storm, his sensible brother-in-law, Reed Richards, and the grumbling Ben Grimm. In the early 1960s, he starred in a series of solo adventures, published in Strange Tales. The Human Torch is also a friend and frequent ally of the superhero Spider-Man, who is approximately the same age.

In films, the Human Torch has been portrayed by Jay Underwood in the unreleased 1994 film The Fantastic Four; Chris Evans in the 2005 film Fantastic Four, and its 2007 sequel Fantastic Four: Rise of the Silver Surfer; and Michael B. Jordan in the 2015 film Fantastic Four.

Publication history
Created by writer Stan Lee and artist Jack Kirby, Johnny Storm is a renovation of Carl Burgos's original character, the android Human Torch, created for Timely Comics in 1939. Storm first appeared in The Fantastic Four #1 (cover-dated Nov. 1961), establishing him as a member of the titular superhero team. In his plot summary for this first issue, Lee passed on to Kirby that the recently formed Comics Code Authority had told him that the Human Torch was only permitted to burn objects, never people. Over the course of the series, Johnny being the little brother of teammate Susan Storm a.k.a. the Invisible Girl was one of several sources of tension within the group.

Additionally, he starred in a solo feature in Strange Tales #101-134 (Oct. 1962 – July 1965). An eight-issue series, The Human Torch (Sept. 1974 – Nov. 1975), reprinted stories from that solo feature, along with stories featuring the original android Human Torch. Later years also saw a 12-issue series, Human Torch (June 2003 - June 2004) by writer Karl Kesel and penciler Skottie Young, and the five-issue team-up miniseries Spider-Man / Human Torch (March–July 2005) by writer Dan Slott and penciler Ty Templeton.

The Human Torch was originally the permanent co-star of Marvel Team-Up, but was dropped after three issues because the creators found this format too restrictive. He co-starred in two one-shot comics, Spider-Man & the Human Torch in... Bahia De Los Muertos! #1 (May 2009), by writer Tom Beland and artist Juan Doe,<ref>[http://www.comics.org/series/40949/ Spider-Man & the Human Torch in... Bahia De Los Muertos!'] at the Grand Comics Database.</ref> and Incredible Hulk & the Human Torch: From the Marvel Vault #1, a previously unpublished story from 1984, originally intended for Marvel Team-Up by plotter Jack C. Harris, scriptwriter and artist Kesel, and breakdown artist Steve Ditko.

Fictional character biography
Early life
Growing up in Glenville, New York, a fictional Long Island suburban town, Johnny Storm lost his mother due to a car accident from which his father, surgeon Franklin Storm, escaped unharmed. Franklin Storm spiraled into alcoholism and financial ruin, and was imprisoned after killing a loan shark in self-defense. Johnny Storm was then raised by his older sister, Sue Storm.

At 16, Storm joined his sister and her fiancé, Reed Richards, in a space flight in which cosmic radiation transformed those three and spacecraft pilot Ben Grimm into superpowered beings who would become the celebrated superhero team the Fantastic Four. Storm, with the ability to become a flaming human with the power of flight and the ability to project fire, dubs himself the Human Torch, in tribute to the World War II-era hero of that name. In The Fantastic Four #4, it is Storm who discovers an amnesiac hobo whom he helps regain his memory as the antihero Namor the Sub-Mariner, one of the three most popular heroes of Marvel Comics' 1940s forerunner, Timely Comics, returning him to modern continuity.

Though a member of a world-famous team, Storm still lived primarily in Glenville and attended Glenville High School. Here he thought he maintained a secret identity, although his fellow townsfolk were well aware of his being a member of the Fantastic Four and simply humored him. This series introduced what would become the recurring Fantastic Four foes the Wizard and Paste-Pot Pete, later known as the Trapster. In Storm's home life, Mike Snow, a member of the high-school wrestling squad, bullied Storm until an accidental flare-up of the Torch's powers scarred Snow's face. Storm dated fellow student Dorrie Evans, although she eventually grew tired of his constant disappearances and broke off their relationship.

College

After graduating high school, Storm enrolled at New York City's Metro College. There he befriended his roommate Wyatt Wingfoot. He also met the original Human Torch of the 1930s and 1940s. Around this time, Storm met and fell in love with Crystal, a member of the superpowered race the Inhumans. After their relationship ended, Crystal returned to her native city of Attilan and eventually married the superhero Quicksilver, Storm, crushed, attempted to move on, finding that his high-school girlfriend, Dorrie Evans, had married and had two children. Storm dropped out of college but remained friends with Wingfoot, who often participated in the Fantastic Four's adventures.

Storm eventually began a romance with who he thought was Alicia Masters but was eventually revealed to be an alien from the shapeshifting Skrull race, Lyja, posing as Masters. In the interim, they married. Storm later discovers "Alicia's" true identity, and that Lyja is pregnant with his child. He then witnessed Lyja's apparent death and rescued the real Alicia from the Skrulls.

Storm briefly joined his nephew Franklin Richards' Fantastic Force team, where he battled his otherdimensional counterpart, Vangaard (formerly Gaard). Lyja posed as student Laura Green and dated Storm to stay close to him; Storm recognized her when they kissed, though he did not reveal this to her until later.

Outside career and anti-registration movement
Seeking an acting career, Storm was cast as the Old West hero the Rawhide Kid, but producers reconsidered and gave the role to Lon Zelig (actually the alien Super-Skrull). After working mostly in some television shows, Storm also spent some time as a firefighter at the behest of his former classmate, Mike Snow, but when Snow moved away after his wife turned out to be a psychopathic arsonist and seemingly died, Storm left the job. He later returned to the profession during a period when the Fantastic Four was short on cash. Frustrated with her brother's directionless life and near-disastrous pranksterism, his sister compelled him to become chief financial officer for the Fantastic Four, Inc. Infighting and betrayal resulted in a near-catastrophe, ending Storm's position.

After a major battle with the supervillain and dictator Doctor Doom, Fantastic Four leader Reed Richards attempted to claim Doom's Latveria for the Fantastic Four, an act that alienated the United States government and his own team. This led to team-member Ben Grimm's apparent death and the Fantastic Four's subsequent dispersal. Storm took to fixing cars for a living. Grimm later was revealed to be alive. Over the Internet, Storm meets a young woman, Cole, whom he learns is the daughter of one of the Fantastic Four's oldest enemies, the Wizard; after a confrontation with that supervillain, who escaped with Cole, Storm remained hopeful of meeting her again. For a time, Storm became the Herald of the powerful cosmic being Galactus, becoming the Invisible Boy after switching powers with his sister and teammate, Susan Richards, the Invisible Woman.

During the 2006–2007 "Civil War" company-wide crossover, in which the superpowered community is split over the Superhuman Registration Act, which required them to register with, and become agents of, the US government, Storm and his sister allied with the underground rebels, the Secret Avengers. Shortly afterward, during the "Secret Invasion" company-wide crossover, the shape-shifting extraterrestrial Skrulls intensified their clandestine infiltration of Earth. Storm was briefly reunited with his former Skrull girlfriend, Lyja. Though part of the invading force, she finds she still has some feelings for him, and does not carry out her mission of sabotage. She returns to her people, unsure of herself and of any future relationship.

Death and return
In the conclusion of the 2011 "Three" storyline, in Fantastic Four #587 (March 2011), the Human Torch appears to die fighting a horde of aliens from the otherdimensional Negative Zone. The series ended with the following issue, #588, and relaunched in March 2011 as simply FF.Ching, Albert. "Hickman Details FANTASTIC FOUR #587's Big Character Death", Newsarama, 25 January 2011 Spider-Man, one of Storm's friends, took his place on the team, as requested in the Torch's will.

It is later revealed that the Human Torch was revived by a species of insect-like creatures that were implanted in his body by Annihilus in an attempt to force Storm to help open the Negative Zone portal. Storm eventually escapes, and Richards determines Storm was on the other side of the portal for two years from his perspective.

The Human Torch becomes an ambassador within Inhuman society and joins Steve Rogers's Avengers Unity Squad and helps Rogue in incinerating the telepathic portions of Professor Xavier's brains, thus unknowingly preventing Hydra from using it for their secret empire.Uncanny Avengers, vol. 3, #22 He becomes a multi-billionaire when he inherits Reed Richards' and Sue Storms' wealth and uses the money for rebuilding the Avengers Mansion and philanthropy. He is seemingly annihilated when he grabs a cosmic object called Pyramoids during the fight between the Lethal Legion and the Black Order in Peru, but is restored after Living Lightning wins a high stakes poker game versus the Grandmaster.

To help the Thing cope with Mister Fantastic and the Invisible Woman's disappearance, the Human Torch takes him on a journey through the Multiverse using the Multisect in order to find them. They have not been able to find Mister Fantastic and the Invisible Woman as they return to Earth-616 empty-handed. The Human Torch and the Thing were reunited with Mister Fantastic and the Invisible Woman to help alongside other superheroes who were part of the Fantastic Four (including surprisingly X-Men's Iceman) fight the Griever at the End of All Things after Mister Fantastic persuaded the Griever to let him summon the Thing and the Human Torch. As the Thing and his teammates finally return to 616, while Future Foundation stays behind to keep learning multiverse, the Thing reveals to them that he proposed to Alicia and they are about to get married soon. Although the Baxter Building is now owned by a new superhero team Fantastix, the Thing allows his teammates to use his hometown Yancy Street as their current operation base. He later becomes engaged with an Unparalleled named Skye at Planet Spyre, who then joins the Fantastic Four to learn about Earth and its other superheroes besides them.

Due to Doctor Doom's mechanism, Johnny Storm's permanently stuck in his Human Torch form. After saving the Watchers, restoring Uatu's power, returning Nick Fury Sr. back to normal, as well as freeing Galactus from being controlled by a Destroyer Armor, with the help of other superheroes across the universe, including Doom against the during Reckoning War, Johnny decides to stay at Spyre for a cure to be able to deactivate his Human Torch form once more.

Romance
The Human Torch has been involved in several romantic relationships throughout the years, including, but not limited to, the Inhuman Crystal, member-in-training and future Galactus herald Frankie Raye, the Skrull agent Lyja disguised as Alicia Masters, the Atlantean Namorita, Inhuman Medusa, and X-Men member Rogue.

Crystal dissolved her relationship with him due to the adverse effects of pollution within population centers of Homo sapiens. Frankie Raye ended her relationship with him when she accepted Galactus' offer to become his newest herald.

Lyja, while in the disguise of the Thing's former girlfriend Alicia Masters, carried on a long-term relationship including marriage with the Torch, until it was revealed that her true nature was as a Skrull double agent. Although the two attempted reconciliation after it was learned that their "child" was actually an implanted weapon to be used against the Fantastic Four, they ultimately parted on less than favorable terms.

Torch's brief relationship with Namorita lasted until he pursued a career in Hollywood. It is suggested that he had a short relationship with his Uncanny Avengers/Unity Squad leader Rogue, following which he had a rebound relationship with Medusa (Crystal's sister). At first it seemed as if he and Rogue resumed their relationship, which was considered as an open secret, however this relationship came to an end after his apparent death and when Rogue rekindled her relationship with Gambit. He has also had relationships with civilian women.

Powers and abilities
Johnny Storm gained a number of superhuman powers as a result of the mutagenic effects of the cosmic radiation he was exposed to, all of which are related to fire. His primary ability to envelop his body in fiery plasma without harm to himself, in which form he is able to fly by providing thrust behind himself with his own flame, and to generate powerful streams and/or balls of flame. He can also manipulate his flame in such a way as to shape it into rings and other forms, such as a fiery duplicate of himself that he can remotely control. Even when not engulfed in flame himself, Storm has the ability to control any fire within his immediate range of vision, causing it to increase or decrease in intensity or to move in a pattern directed by his thoughts. Additionally, he is able to absorb fire/plasma into his body with no detrimental effects.

The plasma field immediately surrounding his body is hot enough to vaporize projectiles that approach him, including bullets. He does not generally extend this flame-aura beyond a few inches from his skin, so as not to ignite nearby objects. Storm refers to his maximum flame output as his "nova flame", which he can release omnidirectionally. Flame of any temperature lower than this cannot burn or harm the Torch. This "nova" effect can occur spontaneously when he absorbs an excessive amount of heat, although he can momentarily suppress the release when necessary, with considerable effort.

Storm has demonstrated enough control with fire that he can safely shave another's hair, or hold a person while in his flame form without his passenger feeling discomforting heat. His knowledge extends to general information about fire as well, supported by regular visits to fire-safety lectures at various firehouses in New York. In one instance when poisoned, Storm superheated his blood to burn the toxin out.

Storm's ability to ignite himself is limited by the quantity of oxygen in his environment, and his personal flame has been extinguished by sufficient quantities of water, flame retardant foam, and vacuum environments. He can reignite instantly once oxygen is returned, with no ill effects. In early stories he could only remain aflame for up to five minutes at a time, after which he would need five minutes to recharge before igniting himself again.

Storm was depicted as transmuting his body itself into living flame in the first two issues of The Fantastic Four. In all subsequent appearances, his power consists in the generation of a flaming aura.

Other versions
1602
In the Marvel 1602 universe, Jon Storm is a young hothead who has to leave London following a duel. Along with his sister, who is escaping a man she does not love, he joins Sir Richard Reed on his explorations, and is caught in the radiation of the Anomaly, turning him into a Human Torch. The Four continue their explorations until they are captured by Otto von Doom prior to the original 1602 miniseries.

At the start of the miniseries 1602: Fantastick Four, Jon has rejoined high society, and once more finds himself embroiled in a duel, this time with Lord Wingfoot, who is betrothed to the 1602 version of Doris Evans. When he is called upon to battle Otto von Doom, he kidnaps Doris and takes her with them, believing this is for her own good.

Age of Apocalypse
In the Age of Apocalypse, Johnny never becomes the Human Torch. Instead, he is among Reed Richards' crew, along with Ben Grimm as pilot and Johnny's sister Susan. Reed Richards attempts to evacuate a full contingent of refugees in his own experimental tran-ship, but a mutant saboteur interferes with the launch. Johnny and Reed sacrifice themselves to save the others from the forces of Apocalypse.

Earth-98
In Earth-98 universe, Johnny married Crystal and has a daughter named Luna and a son named Ray. He is also the leader of the Fantastic Four. He first appeared in Fantastic Four/Fantastic 4 Annual (1998).

Earth-65
In Ghost-Spider's universe, Susan and Johnny Storm went missing on a trip to Latveria. When they return to New York, they are shown twisted to evil and murderers of their own mother.

Earth-A
The Earth-A version of Johnny does not join Reed and Ben in their trip to space. He serves in the Vietnam War, where he is believed to have been killed. However, Johnny is found and saved by Arkon, who gives him superpowers and the new identity of Gaard.

Heroes Reborn
In the Heroes Reborn history of the Marvel Universe, created after a battle with Onslaught, Johnny is an owner of a popular casino and part financial backer of Reed Richards' plan to go into space.  His handprint is one of two — the other being his sister's — needed for launch.  His rivalry with Ben Grimm now extends into much more dangerous areas, such as a potentially deadly game of 'chicken' without thought to the life of the woman in his passenger seat.

After being attacked by agents of Doctor Doom, Johnny ends up going up into space on Reed's spacecraft prototype as he really had nowhere else to go.  The entire launch base had been overtaken by enemy forces and it was miles to civilization.  It is during the flight a cosmic anomaly imbues him and the others with their powers. After the crash of the prototype, Johnny would prove more reliable, recovering Reed Richards and rescuing his own sister.

House Of M
In the House of M: Iron Man limited series, Johnny Storm is a contestant on a reality game show called Sapien Death Match.  He has no inherent superpowers, but wears a suit of powered armor that has a 'flame on' ability.

Marvel Mangaverse
In the Marvel Mangaverse comics, the Human Torch is portrayed by two separate characters spanning two very different continuities. The first character is a member of the Megascale Metatalent Response Team Fantastic Four on Earth-2301a and the mirror opposite of Earth-616's Johnny Storm in terms of personality. The team uses power-packs to boost their talents to manifest at mecha-sized levels in order to combat Godzilla-sized monsters that seem to constantly attack Earth. In volume two of Mangaverse, which takes place on Earth-2301b, the character of Johnny Storm has been replaced with a young woman named Jonatha Storm, who is the half-sister of Sioux Storm. Jonatha is quite hotheaded; sometimes riding into battle singing "I am the Goddess of Hellfire." She denies being impulsive, saying she can only be described that way in comparison to her "neurotic" teammates. In New Mangaverse Jonatha is slightly redesigned to look a few years younger than she did in volume one of Mangaverse, and no longer wears her hair in multiple braids, instead sporting two pigtails on each side of her head. After witnessing the murder of the other Fantastic 4 members by supernatural assassins, she joins Spider-Man, Spider-Woman (Mary Jane Watson), Black Cat, Wolverine, and Iron Man, in hopes of getting revenge.

Marvel Zombies
In this alternative universe crazed Reed Richards recently infects Johnny Storm, Sue Storm, and Ben Grimm with the zombie virus. The three then turn Reed into a zombie and the four of them go on a rampage with the other zombies. Eventually Reed contacts the Ultimate Reed and gets him to come to the infected universe. Johnny travels with the three others to the Ultimate Universe. They attack the Fantastic Four there but are thwarted, and are locked up in a containment cell. Johnny eats live animals and loathes the Ultimate version of himself, remarking that he especially hates his hair. When they escape the four attack the Baxter Building, Ultimate Reed switches bodies with Ultimate Doom and takes on all four zombies. Johnny is last seen being torn apart and extinguished by Reed in Dr. Doom's body.

MC2
In the MC2 alternative future Johnny leads the Fantastic Five. He is married to Lyja and they have a son Torus Storm (who calls himself "Super-Storm" when role-playing as a hero). Torus has inherited both his father's flame powers and his mother's stretching / shapeshifting powers.

Spider-Gwen
In this universe starring Gwen Stacy as Spider-Woman, Johnny and Susan's family are stars of a television series and they are still children. Silk picks up a magazine that says they are entering their fourth season.

Spider-Verse
In the Amazing Spider-man comic's event Spider-Verse, Scarlet Spider (Kaine) and Spider-Man (Ben Reily) met and fought Johnny Storm (Earth-802) who is the Head of Security of Baxter Building and serving one of the Inheritors, Jennix.

Ultimate Marvel
In the Ultimate Marvel Universe, Johnny Storm is the youngest child of Franklin Storm, but is not as intelligent as his sister and father. He spent time at the Baxter Building, but his rebellious nature meant that he learned little from his time spent there.  Although he is portrayed as being very vain, narcissistic, and displays some misogynistic tendencies, he is also shown to have a deep devotion to his friends and family. He is good friends with Spider-Man, and has a friendship/friendly rivalry with Bobby Drake due to each other's respective powers.

He is present at Reed Richards' test of the N-Zone Teleportation Device in the Nevada Desert. After a malfunction in the device, he wakes up in France in a hospital bed. He uncontrollably bursts into flames until he learns to control his powers by saying "Flame On" and "Flame Off.". When Mole Man's creatures attacks, Johnny finds out he can fly while on fire. It is explained by Reed that Johnny's combustion makes him lighter than air. Johnny's body is covered with a microscopically thin film of transparent plates that make him impervious to flame. When he activates his powers, fat cells beneath his skin create clean nuclear fusion and jet out between the plates as plasma which then ignites on contact with air. Periodically, Johnny enters a hibernation where his old layer of skin peels off as ash while a new layer forms underneath. Unlike the mainstream Human Torch, Ultimate Johnny's power sometimes have detrimental effects on his health, specifically causing unhealthy levels of weight loss and exhaustion.

In issues #68 and 69 of Ultimate Spider-Man, Johnny meets Spider-Man when his sister says he has to finish high school.  Johnny picks a school in Queens which happens to be Midtown High. He quickly meets and becomes friends with Peter Parker, Mary Jane and Liz Allan. At a bonfire, he catches fire and scares off Liz Allan.  He arranges to meet Liz, but she does not show up.

Encouraged by Mary Jane, Spider-Man shows up instead and gives Johnny a heart-to-heart talk about great power and great responsibility. Together, they save people from a burning building when Johnny absorbs the flames. Spider-Man shows Johnny that they will not always be appreciated by the public.

In issue #98 of Ultimate Spider-Man, the Fantastic Four learn Spider-Man's identity, and Johnny recognizes Peter.  In issue #101, Nick Fury and a regiment of Spider Slayers try to arrest Peter but are stopped by Johnny and the rest of the Fantastic Four.

In the "Spider-Man and his Amazing Friends" story arc (beginning with issue #118 and concluding in issue #120) Johnny returns to Midtown High wanting to spend time with real friends after becoming frustrated on a date with a popular pop-star who only came for publicity. After some prodding, Johnny arranges for a group consisting of himself, Peter, Mary Jane, Kitty Pryde, Kong, Bobby Drake and Liz Allan (Johnny's apparent romantic interest) to have a somewhat normal day at the beach. During the evening bonfire, mirror his last visit, Liz Allan bursts into flame, exposing herself as a mutant. At the end of the arc, Liz returns to the Xaiver Institute with Iceman.

In Issue #129 of Ultimate Spider-Man, Johnny attends another unsuccessful date with the same pop-star as before and after again becoming frustrated calls Peter Parker to give him an excuse to leave. Johnny laments that he does not know any nice girls and has no real way of meeting any, and wants Peter to set him up. After flying off, he encounters The Vulture mid-robbery. Johnny attempts to stop him, but is thwarted several times before being assisted by Spider-Woman (a female clone of Peter Parker who is still mentally Peter up to the point of her "birth" in the Clone Saga story arc, a fact not disclosed to Johnny). Johnny proceeds to follow her around asking her for details about who she is, going as far to flirt with her. The very embarrassed Spider-Woman swings off.

Throughout the first story arc of Ultimate Comics: Spider-Man (the continuation of Ultimate Spider-Man), Johnny Storm appears at Peter Parker's door and passes out in his arms. When he wakes up he informs Aunt May that he does not wish to return to the Baxter Building. Aunt May decides to let him live with her, Peter and Gwen (later also adding Bobby Drake to the household as well). As to not raise suspicion and to not reveal Peters' secret identity, Aunt May comes up with the idea of coloring Johnny's hair black and changing his name to Johnny Parker, Peter's cousin. She then enrolls him and Bobby at Midtown High along with Peter and Gwen. The school is then attacked by a Spider-Slayer, created by Mysterio, to hunt down Spider-Man. Johnny runs away from the school before "Flaming On", as to not reveal his new secret identity, then returns to aid Peter in the fight, only to discover that the Shroud has already taken care of it. Johnny decides to melt the remains of the Spider-Slayer anyway.

Later when Norman Osborn escapes alongside The Vulture, Kraven the Hunter, Electro, Doctor Octopus, and The Sandman, Johnny and Bobby find them at Peters home and Johnny manages to knock Osborn unconscious before sandman does the same to him. Spider-Man then wakes him up to fight Osborn again but Johnny only succeeds in adding to Osborn's power before being knocked out yet again. Afterwards Spider-Man is killed after defeating Osborn and the other supervillains and Johnny is the one who checks to see if he truly is dead.
Ultimate Johnny appears briefly in issue one of Ultimate Fallout. In this issue, distressed by Peter's death he screams and releases most of his energy above the city.

Johnny eventually joins Kitty Pryde's team of mutants in the pages of Ultimate Comics: X-Men. He elects to stay behind and defend a group of younger mutants in the Morlock tunnels while Kitty, Iceman, Jimmy Hudson, and Rogue decide to head to the Southwest to fight off the Sentinels. He is later rescued wandering the streets of New York, having been severely tortured. The only clue to the fate of the children is a garbled phone call to Kitty by one of the children lamenting Johnny's disappearance.

Johnny also makes an appearance in the Ultimate Spider-Man video game, in which he challenges Spider-Man to a series of races.

Counter-Earth
On Counter Earth, counterparts of the Fantastic Four hijack an experimental spaceship in order to be the first humans in space. Man-Beast negates the effects of the cosmic radiation for all of them except Reed Richards who succumbs to the effects a decade later.  Johnny Storm's counterpart is revealed to have been killed by the cosmic radiation.

What If? Vol. II #11

In What If? vol. 2 #11 (March 1990), the origins of the Fantastic Four are retold, showing how the heroes lives would have changed if all four had gained the same powers as the individual members of the original Fantastic Four. In "Pyros", all have the power of the Human Torch; after the team sets fire to what they believe to be an uninhabited area in order to battle a monster, they inadvertently kill the daughter of a woman squatting one of those buildings; the guilt causes them to disband, after which Reed Richards returns to his research, Storm becomes a race car driver and Grimm adopts the Human Torch moniker and joins the Avengers. Susan Storm, who could never forgive herself for the child's death, took monastic vows and spent the rest of her life as a nun in penance. In "Team Elastics", all have the power of Mister Fantastic, but Grimm, Sue Storm and Reed Richards all believe their powers to be silly; which also causes Sue Storm to leave Reed. Reed Richards returns to his research, only using his powers to aid him in his work, such as handling dangerous chemicals at far range, and Sue marries Ben Grimm, where they live a quiet domestic life free of superpowers. Johnny is the only member to go public, where he becomes a performer called "Mr. Fabulous", using his powers to gain fame, fortune and women. In "Monstrous", all become monsters, and relocate to Monster Isle. In "The Phantoms", each gain one aspect of the invisibility power, with Johnny able to become intangible.  The story focuses on the four becoming a special secret unit of S.H.I.E.L.D. which defends against an attack by, and ultimately captures and places in custody, Doom.

In other media
Television
 The Human Torch was a regular character in the 1967 Fantastic Four series, voiced by Jack Flounders.
 The Human Torch did not appear in the 1978 Fantastic Four series and was replaced with a robot called H.E.R.B.I.E. The television rights to the character had been separately licensed, although never actually used, for a television pilot movie by Universal Studios, preventing him from appearing. For the same reason, he was supposed to be one of the main characters on Spider-Man and His Amazing Friends, but Firestar was created in his place.
 The Human Torch appears in the 1994 Fantastic Four series, voiced by Brian Austin Green in the first season and by Quinton Flynn in the second season.
 The Human Torch and the rest of the Fantastic Four appeared in the 1994 Spider-Man series episode "Secret Wars", voiced again by Quinton Flynn.
 The Human Torch appears in Fantastic Four: World's Greatest Heroes, voiced by Christopher Jacot.
 The Human Torch appears in The Super Hero Squad Show, voiced by Travis Willingham.
 The Human Torch appears in The Avengers: Earth's Mightiest Heroes, voiced by David Kaufman.
 The Human Torch appears in the Hulk and the Agents of S.M.A.S.H. episode "Monsters No More", voiced by James Arnold Taylor. He teamed up with the Agents of S.M.A.S.H. to stop the Tribbitites invasion.

Film
Jay Underwood played Johnny Storm in the unreleased Fantastic Four film produced by Roger Corman.

Chris Evans played The Human Torch/Johnny Storm in the 2005 film Fantastic Four. In the film, he is an intelligent, yet arrogant, young man in his early twenties who loves extreme sports. He is the younger brother of Susan Storm, who works within Von Doom Industries as Victor von Doom's chief of the Science Department. He reprised his role as Johnny Storm in Fantastic Four: Rise of the Silver Surfer. When his older sister's wedding is interrupted by the Silver Surfer, Johnny pursues the Surfer and loses the subsequent confrontation. Due to his contact with the Surfer, Johnny is thereafter able to switch powers with any of his teammates through physical contact. This change thwarts their attempt to trap the Silver Surfer when he accidentally switches powers with Reed. However, when Doom steals the Surfer's board and powers, Johnny uses his change to absorb the powers of the entire team, using Sue's invisibility and his own flame powers to sneak up on Doom before overpowering him with the Thing's strength and Reed's elasticity. He loses the ability to switch powers when he makes contact with the Surfer for a second time.
Simon Rex portrayed the Human Torch in the spoof film Superhero Movie (2008).
Michael B. Jordan portrayed Johnny Storm in the 2015 film Fantastic Four. While Johnny Storm is still the biological son of Franklin Storm, Susan Storm is his adoptive sister. He gains his powers following a visit to Planet Zero. Since the incident, the scientists working with Franklin Storm designed a special suit that helped Johnny to master his powers. After Victor von Doom returned from Planet Zero and was making his way back to the Quantum Gate to further his goals, Johnny was devastated when Victor killed Franklin Storm. Johnny later helped Reed, Susan and Ben fight Victor.

Video games
 The Human Torch makes a guest appearance in The Amazing Spider-Man 2 for the Game Boy and PlayStation 2.
 The Human Torch is one of the Fantastic Four members who make an appearance in Spider-Man for the SNES.
 The Human Torch featured prominently in the 2000 Spider-Man video game, voiced by Daran Norris. He first appears in a cutscene, encouraging Spider-Man to find his wife Mary Jane, who was kidnapped by Venom. At the end of the game, he is seen dancing with the Black Cat, while Spider-Man and the other heroes featured in the game play cards.
 The Human Torch appears in his own game for the Game Boy Advance titled Fantastic 4: Flame On.
 The Human Torch is a playable character in the Fantastic Four video game based on the 2005 movie, voiced by Chris Evans with his classic version reprised by Quinton Flynn in bonus levels.
 The Ultimate Marvel version of the Human Torch appeared in the 2005 Ultimate Spider-Man game, voiced by David Kaufman. The player, as Spider-Man, had to race the Torch through New York.
 The Human Torch appears in the 2007 Fantastic Four: Rise of the Silver Surfer video game, voiced by Michael Broderick.
 The Human Torch also appeared as a playable character in the Electronic Arts-produced title Marvel Nemesis: Rise of the Imperfects, voiced by Kirby Morrow.
 The Human Torch appears as a playable character in Marvel: Ultimate Alliance, voiced by Josh Keaton. His classic, Ultimate, original, and modern costumes are available. A simulation disk has Human Torch fighting Paibok. He has special dialogue with Black Widow, Hank Pym, Thing, Crystal, Uatu, Karnak, Wyatt Wingfoot, Black Bolt, and Shocker.
 The Human Torch appears as a playable character in Marvel: Ultimate Alliance 2, voiced again by David Kaufman.
 The Human Torch is a playable character in Marvel Super Hero Squad Online, voiced by Antony Del Rio.
 The Human Torch is available as downloadable content for the game LittleBigPlanet, as part of "Marvel Costume Kit 2".
 The Human Torch appeared in the virtual pinball game Fantastic Four for Pinball FX 2, voiced by Travis Willingham.
 The Human Torch is a playable character in the mobile game Marvel: Future Fight.
 The Human Torch is a playable character in the Facebook game Marvel: Avengers Alliance.
 The Human Torch appears as a playable character in the 2012 fighting game Marvel Avengers: Battle for Earth, voiced by Roger Craig Smith.
 The Human Torch is a playable character in the MMORPG Marvel Heroes, voiced by Matthew Yang King. However, due to legal reasons, he was removed from the game on July 1, 2017.
 The Human Torch appears as a playable character in Lego Marvel Super Heroes, voiced again by Roger Craig Smith.
 The Human Torch is a playable character in the mobile game Marvel Puzzle Quest.
 The Human Torch appears in the "Shadow of Doom" DLC of Marvel Ultimate Alliance 3: The Black Order, voiced again by Matthew Yang King.

Radio
 In 1975, Bill Murray played Johnny Storm in a daily radio adaptation of the early issues of Fantastic Four. The show lasted for 13 weeks.

Toys
 Human Torch appeared as an 8-inch action figure in Mego's World's Greatest Super Heroes toy line in the 1970s.
 Human Torch has appeared in the Marvel Legends toy line, in series 2, in the three version of the Fantastic Four box set (the ordinary, variant and the Wal-Mart special).
 Though it is a different character, the Inhuman Torch (Kristoff Vernard) appeared in the "House of M" box set.
 The Human Torch is the eighteenth figurine in The Classic Marvel Figurine Collection.

Reception
The Human Torch was ranked as the 90th greatest comic book character by Wizard'' magazine. IGN ranked the Human Torch as the 46th greatest comic book hero, stating that even though the youngest member of the Fantastic Four routinely basked in the glory of his celebrity status, he also proved himself in his many adventures with both the Fantastic Four and Spider-Man.

Collected editions

References

External links
 The Human Torch on the Marvel Universe Character Bio
 MDP: Human Torch (Marvel Database Project) (wiki)
 The Religion of the Human Torch

Avengers (comics) characters
Characters created by Jack Kirby
Characters created by Stan Lee
Comics characters introduced in 1961
Fantastic Four characters
Fictional actors
Fictional astronauts
Fictional characters from New York City
Fictional characters with absorption or parasitic abilities
Fictional characters with fire or heat abilities
Fictional firefighters
Fictional racing drivers
Marvel Comics American superheroes
Marvel Comics film characters
Marvel Comics mutates
Marvel Comics superheroes